The BRP Dagupan City (LS-551) is the second and last ship of two Bacolod City class logistics support vessel, and is based on a helicopter capable variant of the US Army Frank S. Besson class. She is also considered one of the most modern transport ships in the Philippine Navy, having been commissioned during the early 1990s.  She was previously known as BRP Dagupan City (LC-551) prior to a classification change implemented by the Philippine Navy starting April 2016

History
The BRP Dagupan City was built by Halter/Moss Point Marine of Escatawpa, Mississippi in the United States and was commissioned into Philippine Navy in 1994. Both ships of its class were purchased brand-new by the Philippine government through the FMS program of the United States. Since its commissioning, both ships of its class were rigorously used in military and peacetime operations, and has been joining joint military exercises with foreign navies as well.

Presently it is assigned with the Service Force of the Philippine Fleet.

Renaming Issues
Originally named as the BRP Cagayan de Oro City, she was commissioned with the Philippine Navy as BRP Dagupan City. Recent photos show the words "BRP Cagayan de Oro City" still embossed at the rear end of the ship's steel surface. Details of the renaming were not made public.

Technical details
The ship is powered by two General Motors-EMD 16-645EZ6 diesel engines with a combined power of around 5,800 hp driving two propellers.

As an amphibious transport, it is fairly armed for defensive purposes, and carries four 7.62mm general purpose machine guns at the front side decks, and two Oerlikon 20 mm cannons near its two LCVPs.

The prime mission of the ship is the direct transport and discharge of liquid and dry cargo to shallow terminal areas, remote under-developed coastlines and on inland waterways.

The ship does not require external cranes or port facilities, and even in only four feet of water under full load, the ship is still able to land. This capability expands the choice of landing locations, and at the same time reduces the potential enemy impact on the logistics support operations.

The ships have a capacity to transport up to 48 TEU or 2,280 tons vehicles/general cargo, or up to 900 tons on Logistics Over The Shore (LOTS) / amphibious operations. Its ramps and the main deck are able to withstand roll-on/roll-off operations of even heavy main battle tanks.

Notable Operations

Exercises
The Dagupan City, together with BRP Leopoldo Regis (PG-847), BRP Rajah Humabon (PF-11), BRP Artemio Ricarte (PS-37), USS Essex (LHD-2), and USS Tortuga (LSD-46) were part of the naval component of the US-RP Balikatan 2009 (BK09) bi-lateral exercises held in April 2009.

Again Dagupan City, together with BRP Rajah Humabon (PF-11), and BRP Apolinario Mabini (PS-36), USS Essex (LHD-2), and USS Denver (LPD-9) were part of the naval phase of the US-RP Balikatan 2010 (BK10) bi-lateral exercises held in March 2010.

Deployments

BRP Dagupan City together with BRP Quezon (PS-70) were sent to Singapore and Malaysia from November to December 2009 for an overseas training cruise for students from the Naval Education and Training Command and the Fleet Training Center, and as part of the Philippine contingent at Langkawi International Maritime and Aerospace Exhibition (LIMA) in Malaysia.

Gallery

References

External links
 Philippine Navy Official website
 Philippine Fleet Official Website
 BRP Bacolod City threads @ Philippine Defense Forum
 World Navies Today: Philippines
 Opus224's Unofficial Philippine Defense Page

Bacolod City-class support vessels
Ships built in Moss Point, Mississippi
1994 ships